Ascheberg (Westf) station is a railway station in the municipality of Ascheberg (Westfalen), located in the Coesfeld district in North Rhine-Westphalia, Germany.

References

Railway stations in North Rhine-Westphalia
Buildings and structures in Coesfeld (district)